The 2018 Campeonato Internacional de Tênis de Campinas was a professional tennis tournament played on clay courts. It was the seventh edition of the tournament which was part of the 2018 ATP Challenger Tour. It took place in Campinas, Brazil between 1 and 7 October 2018.

Singles main-draw entrants

Seeds

 1 Rankings as of 24 September 2018.

Other entrants
The following players received wildcards into the singles main draw:
  Rafael Matos
  Felipe Meligeni Alves
  Matheus Pucinelli de Almeida
  Thiago Seyboth Wild

The following players received entry from the qualifying draw:
  Nicolás Álvarez
  Emilio Gómez
  João Souza
  Camilo Ugo Carabelli

Champions

Singles

  Christian Garín def.  Federico Delbonis 6–3, 6–4.

Doubles

  Hugo Dellien /  Guillermo Durán def.  Franco Agamenone /  Fernando Romboli 7–5, 6–4.

External links
Official Website

Campeonato Internacional de Tênis de Campinas
2018
2018 in Brazilian tennis